Ethelbert was a juvenile orca that surfaced in the Columbia River near Portland, Oregon in October 1931. The orca swam 100 miles from the sea up the river. Being a rare sighting that far up the river, many sportsmen grabbed rifles and guns and began to shoot the whale to try and kill it for themselves. The Governor Julius L. Meier ordered them to stop. Some thought the whale was healthy but others thought it was slowly dying and needed to be humanely put down. Ed Lessard, a former whaler, and his son Joseph Lessard set out with harpoons and killed the whale, who had gained the name Ethelbert.

The body of the whale was retrieved by others and pickled in embalming fluid for preservation. Ethelbert was seized by the State of Oregon and later, through many legal battles going all the way to the Supreme Court, the whale was procured by Lessard. Some years after, Lessard carted Ethelbert around the country as a showpiece. After retiring the show, he brought the whale to his property on a mountain in Washougal, WA where the whale still rests, resisting decay.

See also
 List of individual cetaceans

References 

 
 
 

Individual orcas
Individual wild animals
1931 in Oregon
Wayward cetaceans
History of Portland, Oregon